is a railway station on the Ōu Main Line in the city of Hirosaki, Aomori Prefecture, Japan, operated by East Japan Railway Company (JR East).

Lines

Station layout
Naijōshi Station has two ground level opposed side platforms, connected to the station building by a footbridge. The station is unattended.

Platforms

History
Naijōshi Station was opened on April 15, 1935, as a station on the Japanese Government Railways (JGR), which became Japanese National Railways (JNR) after World War II. The station has been unattended since October 1, 1971. With the privatization of JNR on April 1, 1987, the station came under the operational control of JR East.

Surrounding area
Sakaizuki Onsen

See also
 List of railway stations in Japan

External links

   

Stations of East Japan Railway Company
Railway stations in Aomori Prefecture
Ōu Main Line
Hirosaki
Railway stations in Japan opened in 1935